"Coma Cat" is a song by German record producer Tensnake. It was released on 25 January 2010 and re-released on 20 September 2010 through Defected Records and Permanent Vacation. The song reached number 85 in the UK Singles Chart, number 17 in the UK Dance Chart and number 11 in the UK Indie Chart. The song is loosely based on Anthony and the Camps song What I Like from 1986. The DJ and producer Mark Knight also produced an official remix of the track.

Music video
The official video for "Coma Cat" premiered on 8 October 2010, at a total length of 2 minutes and 57 seconds.

Track listing

Chart performance

Weekly charts

References

2010 singles
2010 songs